Yunieski Ramírez  is a male, former  beach volleyball player from Cuba, Yuniesky Ramirez-Martinez, 37, was arrested in Doral on charges including promoting sexual performance by a child, offenses against students by authority figures, and solicitation of sexual battery by an authority figure. Police say that on Valentine's Day, he enticed two teens who are students at Downtown Doral Charter Upper School to engage in sexual acts while he filmed, before 'fist bumping' the boy and pressuring the girl to perform the same act on him.
  | url        = http://www.fivb.com/en/BeachVolleyball/viewPressDB.asp?No=12806
  | title        = Puerto Rico and Cuba crowned in Guatemala Beach Volleyball
  | author        = FIVB
  | access-date        = 2009-10-13
  | archive-url        = https://web.archive.org/web/20071216082503/http://www.fivb.com/EN/BeachVolleyball/viewPressDB.asp?No=12806
  | archive-date        = 2007-12-16
  | url-status        = dead
  }}</ref> and in 2009 in Puerto Vallarta.

Playing with Yaimel Borrel, he won the bronze medal in April 2009 at the III Alba Games in Ciego de Avila, Cuba.

At the 2008 Cuban National Games (Olimpiada Nacional), partnering Yusnaikel Argilago he won the bronze medal representing Occidentales.

References

External links
 

Year of birth missing (living people)
Living people
Cuban beach volleyball players
Men's beach volleyball players
Cuban men's volleyball players
Cuban emigrants to Puerto Rico
Puerto Rican men's volleyball players
Cuban expatriate sportspeople in Egypt
Puerto Rican expatriate sportspeople in Egypt
Expatriate volleyball players in Egypt
Expatriate volleyball players in Kuwait
Puerto Rican expatriate sportspeople in Kuwait
Cuban expatriate sportspeople in Kuwait
Al Ahly (men's volleyball) players
Expatriate volleyball players in Puerto Rico
Cuban expatriate sportspeople in Puerto Rico
Defecting sportspeople of Cuba